is the pen name of a Japanese novelist and anime screenwriter. His major works include Mardock Scramble, Le Chevalier D'Eon and Heroic Age. He also did series composition for the Fafner in the Azure series, Ghost in the Shell: Arise, Psycho-Pass 2 and Psycho-Pass 3.

Early life
Ubukata was raised in Singapore and later Nepal.

Career
In high school, Ubukata received several writer's awards. In 1996, he debuted as a writer of short stories and won the Kadokawa Sneaker Award with his story Black Season. In 2009, he won the Eiji Yoshikawa Award for New Writers with his story Tenchi Meisatsu. In 2012, he won the Fūtarō Yamada Award for his story Mitsukuni-den.

Ubukata writes for the Japanese visual culture magazine Newtype. His serialized segments, called "A Gambler's Life", are comedic, often-satiric expository pieces. They chronicle his day-to-day experiences and interactions with people, such as his wife. In these segments, he dubs himself "The Kamikazi Wordsmith". These segments were also published in the American counterpart, Newtype USA, which is now discontinued.

Ubukata won the 24th Nihon SF Taisho Award in 2003. Ubukata has written the novelization and the script for the manga version of Le Chevalier D'Eon, and has contributed to the screenplay and the overall story plot of the animated version.

Personal life

On August 21, 2015, Ubukata allegedly hit his then-wife in her jaw and mouth area at their home in Aoyama, Minato Ward of Tokyo, breaking her front tooth. She reported the incident to the police the next day, leading to his arrest on August 24, 2015. Ubukata admitted they had an argument but denied hitting her. On August 26, 2015, Mito City mayor Yasushi Takahashi decided to put NHK's offer to film a live-action taiga drama adaptation of Ubukuta's novel, Mitsukuni-den, in the city itself on hold. Ubukata was released on September 1, 2015 without indictment. The Public Prosecutors Office dropped charges against him in October 2015, with one reason being that his wife did not want to press charges. Following the incident, Ubukata announced that he planned on writing a memoir based on his experiences in jail, titled, 9 Days Trapped. In 2016, one year after his arrest and release, Ubukata revealed that he and his wife had divorced, with his wife taking custody of their children.

Filmography

Anime

Anime films

References

External links
  
 Tow Ubkata anime, manga at Media Arts Database 
 Entry in The Encyclopedia of Science Fiction
 

1977 births
Japanese expatriates in Nepal
Japanese expatriates in Singapore
Japanese science fiction writers
Living people
Writers from Gifu Prefecture
Pseudonymous writers